Farnsfield is a rural locality in the Bundaberg Region, Queensland, Australia.

Geography
The Gregory River forms the northern and north-eastern boundaries. Sandy Creek rises in the south of the locality and flows east, forming a small section of the southern boundary and another of the south-eastern boundary before joining the Gregory.

References 

Bundaberg Region
Localities in Queensland